William Alexander Louis Stephen Douglas-Hamilton, 12th Duke of Hamilton, 9th Duke of Brandon, 2nd Duke of Châtellerault KT (12 March 1845 in London – 16 May 1895 in Algiers) was a Scottish nobleman.

Biography

Hamilton was born at Connaught Place, London, the son of William Hamilton, 11th Duke of Hamilton and Princess Marie of Baden, the adoptive granddaughter of Napoleon Bonaparte. Through his mother, Hamilton was related to numerous European royal families. Among his first cousins were King Carol I of Romania and Queen Stephanie of Portugal (children of his aunt Josephine) and Queen Carola of Saxony (daughter of his aunt Louise).

Hamilton was educated at Eton College and Christ Church, Oxford. A description of Hamilton pertaining to this period in his life has this description of him to offer:
"At Christchurch, he went in for boxing, as he went in later for horse-racing, yachting and other amusements... He was full bodied, of a rudely ruddy complexion, had a powerful neck, and seemed strong enough to fell an ox with his fist... He had a frankness of speech bordering on rudeness".

In July 1863, Hamilton's father died and 18-year-old Hamilton became the 12th Duke of Hamilton. His inheritance was not great, for the 11th Duke, having married a princess, had lived in befitting style. Among other things, he had purchased  a house in London from the Duke of Beaufort for the vast sum of £60,000 and lavished further monies on that property over the period of a decade. He had also built extensively in Scotland, almost tripling the size of Brodick Castle and remodeling it in Bavarian style in honour of his wife. At his death, he left an estate valued at £140,000, to be divided between his wife and children. Hamilton did inherit a significant portion of this estate, but by 1867, he was close to financial ruin when providentially, his race horse Cortolvin won the Grand National Steeplechase at Aintree. In addition to substantial prize money, Hamilton also took some £16,000 from the bookmakers, restoring his fortune substantially. However, his mother (who had inherited the house in London), still found it necessary or prudent to sell that property, and it was auctioned in that same year (1867).

In 1869, Hamilton's younger sister, Mary, married Albert I, Prince of Monaco. She left her husband within two years of marriage, was later divorced from him and then married a Hungarian count, but her son would nevertheless succeed to the throne of Monaco as Louis II, Prince of Monaco; all future rulers of Monaco are descended from her.

On 10 December 1873, Hamilton married Lady Mary Montagu, daughter of William Montagu, 7th Duke of Manchester, at Kimbolton Castle and they had one daughter:
Lady Mary Louise Douglas-Hamilton (1 November 1884 – 21 February 1957), she married James Graham, 6th Duke of Montrose on 14 June 1906. They had four children.

Hamilton died at Algiers in 1895, aged 50. The title passed to his fourth cousin, who became the 13th Duke of Hamilton.

Ancestry

References

External links
Regiments.org

1845 births
1895 deaths
Alumni of Christ Church, Oxford
112
109
09
William Douglas-Hamilton, 12th Duke of Hamilton
502
Knights of the Thistle
People educated at Eton College
Queen's Own Royal Glasgow Yeomanry officers